This list concerns consorts of Partitioned Poland, from 1795 and 19th and early 20th century. For the historical royal consorts of Poland until 1795, see List of Polish consorts.

Consort of the Duchy of Warsaw

After the Partition of Poland

See also
 List of rulers of Partitioned Poland

Partitions of Poland
Polish queens consort
Poland, List of royal consorts of